KEPCO may refer to:
 Kansai Electric Power Company, a Japanese power provider
 Korea Electric Power Corporation, a South Korean power provider
KEPCO E&C, a nuclear power design and engineering company, and subsidiary of the Korea Electric Power Corporation
Kepco Power, a power supply manufacturer in New York